Sounds of St. Lucia: Live is a live album released by Image Entertainment, on both CD and DVD, of a performance by Acoustic Alchemy at the tenth St. Lucia Jazz Festival in 2000.

The band line-up on this album consists of Greg Carmichael (nylon guitar), Miles Gilderdale (steel guitar), Frank Felix (bass), Tony White (keyboards) and Richard Brook (drums).

The DVD version is released in Dolby Digital 5.1 Surround Sound and contains two additional tracks not on the CD: "Catalina Kiss" and "Casino".  "Catalina Kiss" is the lead in and "Casino" is the lead out song of the DVD.  Both show scenic views of St. Lucia.  Excluding these two extra tracks, the song order is identical with the exception of "Trail Blazer" and "Red Dust & Spanish Lace".

Track listings

CD

DVD

External links 
 

Acoustic Alchemy albums
2003 live albums
Live video albums
Image Entertainment live albums
Image Entertainment video albums